Sharlee D'Angelo (born Charles Petter Andreason, 27 April 1973) is the Swedish bassist for the melodic death metal band Arch Enemy, as well as the classic rock/AOR band the Night Flight Orchestra and the stoner metal band Spiritual Beggars.

D'Angelo has also been in various bands in the past, either as a studio session player or full member. These include Arch Enemy, Mercyful Fate, Dismember, King Diamond and Witchery.

Equipment
He plays with Dunlop picks and primarily used Rickenbacker bass guitars in his early career, before switching to playing and endorsing Ibanez Iceman bass guitars in 2005. Ibanez now produces the Sharlee D'Angelo signature bass guitar, called the SDB2, which is tuned to D'Angelo's preferred C standard (Low to High – C, F, Bb, Eb).

Influences
D'Angelo has cited a number of bass players as early influences, including Roger Glover, Glenn Hughes, Steve Dawson, Peter Baltes, and John Entwistle.

Discography

With Mercyful Fate 
 1994 - Time
 1996 - Into the Unknown
 1998 - Dead Again
 1999 - 9

With Facelift 
 1997 - State of the Art

With IllWill 
 1998 - Evilution

With Witchery 
 1998 - Restless & Dead
 1999 - Dead, Hot and Ready
 2001 - Symphony for the Devil
 2006 - Don't Fear the Reaper
 2010 - Witchkrieg
 2016 - In His Infernal Majesty's Service
 2017 - I Am Legion

With Sinergy 
 1999 - Beware the Heavens

With Arch Enemy 
 1999 - Burning Bridges
 2000 - Burning Japan Live 1999
 2001 - Wages of Sin
 2003 - Anthems of Rebellion
 2005 - Doomsday Machine
 2006 - Live Apocalypse
 2007 - Rise of the Tyrant
 2008 - Tyrants of the Rising Sun
 2009 - The Root of All Evil
 2011 - Khaos Legions
 2014 - War Eternal
 2017 - Will to Power
 2022 - Deceivers

With Dismember 
 2000 - Hate Campaign

With Spiritual Beggars 
 2005 - Demons
 2010 - Return to Zero
 2013 - Earth Blues
 2016 - Sunrise to Sundown

With the Night Flight Orchestra 
 2012 - Internal Affairs
 2015 - Skyline Whispers
 2017 - Amber Galactic
 2018 - Sometimes the World Ain't Enough
 2020 - Aeromantic
 2021 - Aeromantic II

References

External links

 Official Arch Enemy website
 Official Arch Enemy MySpace page
 Official Spiritual Beggars MySpace page
 Brazilian Arch Enemy fansite
 Ibanez Sharlee D'Angelo SDB2 signature model
 Official King Diamond & Mercyful Fate website & fan club
 

Death metal musicians
Swedish heavy metal bass guitarists
King Diamond (band) members
Mercyful Fate members
Arch Enemy members
Living people
1973 births
Witchery members
Spiritual Beggars members
Dismember (band) members
21st-century bass guitarists
Sinergy members